Paul Mikat (10 December 1924 – 24 September 2011) was a German politician of the Christian Democratic Union (CDU) and former member of the German Bundestag.

Life 
In 1962, Mikat was appointed Minister of Education and Cultural Affairs of the state of North Rhine-Westphalia; he held this office until the change to a social-liberal coalition in 1966. From 1966 to 1969 he was a member of the North Rhine-Westphalian state parliament. From 1969 to 1987 he was a member of the German Bundestag.

Literature

References 

1924 births
2011 deaths
Members of the Bundestag for North Rhine-Westphalia
Members of the Bundestag 1983–1987
Members of the Bundestag 1980–1983
Members of the Bundestag 1976–1980
Members of the Bundestag 1972–1976
Members of the Bundestag 1969–1972
Members of the Bundestag for the Christian Democratic Union of Germany
Members of the Landtag of North Rhine-Westphalia